Stuart Lightbody (born 16 October 1992) is a Northern Irish male badminton player. Lightbody was a social secretary in Ulster University Sports Union. In 2012, he became the runner-up of Irish Future Series tournament in mixed doubles event with his partner Caroline Black.

References

External links
 

1992 births
Living people
Irish male badminton players